The Caroaebe River (sometimes incorrectly referred to as the Caroebe River which is further south) is a river of Roraima state in northern Brazil, near the equator.

Geography
 
The river flows westward to approximately  where it merges with the larger Anauá River, just prior to the Majada waterfall which is to the north of São Luiz.

Ecology
 
Along the river, biologists have studied species of black flies (Simulium guianense and Simulium litobranchium, see Simulium) which carry a parasite that causes river-blindness.

See also
 List of rivers of Roraima

References

Notes 
 

 

Rivers of Roraima